This is an incomplete list of the paintings by the  French Impressionist artist Frédéric Bazille.  In his brief career (he was killed at the age of 28 in the Franco-Prussian War) he produced some 70 canvasses.

References

Bazille